Monique Marinho Pavão (born 31 October 1986) is a Brazilian volleyball player. She is part of the Brazil women's national volleyball team. On club level she played for SESI in 2014. She often competes alongside her twin sister Michelle.

Clubs

  Macaé (2004–2007)
  Rio de Janeiro (2007–2010)
  Macaé (2010–2011)
  Praia Clube (2011–2014)
  SESI São Paulo (2014–2015)
  Rio de Janeiro (2015–2019)
  Praia Clube (2019–2021)
  Sesc-RJ/Flamengo (2021–)

Awards

Individuals
 2017 South American Club Championship – "Best Opposite Spiker"

Clubs
 2015–16 Brazilian Superliga –  Champion, with Rexona-Ades
 2016–17 Brazilian Superliga –  Champion, with Rexona-SESC
 2017–18 Brazilian Superliga –  Runner-up, with SESC Rio
 2020–21 Brazilian Superliga –  Runner-up, with Dentil/Praia Clube
 2016 South American Club Championship –  Champion, with Rexona-Ades
 2017 South American Club Championship –  Champion, with Rexona-SESC
 2018 South American Club Championship –  Runner-up, with SESC Rio
 2020 South American Club Championship –  Runner-up, with Dentil/Praia Clube
 2017 FIVB Club World Championship –  Runner-up, with Rexona-SESC

References

1986 births
Living people
Brazilian women's volleyball players
Place of birth missing (living people)
Opposite hitters
Volleyball players from Rio de Janeiro (city)